Frans Molenaar (11 May 1940 – 9 January 2015) was a Dutch fashion designer.

He studied to become a tailor in Amsterdam from 1955 to 1958. After his studies he did an internship with Charles Montaigne in Paris from 1959 to 1960 and worked for Gerard Pipart at Nina Ricci also in Paris from 1961 to 1964.

In 1967 he started his own business "Frans Molenaar Couture" and he worked as an haute couture designer since.

He initiated the fashion award Frans Molenaar prijs in 1995.

Molenaar died 9 January 2015, after suffering injuries from falling down a staircase at his home in December 2014. He was 74 years old. His final rest is at Zorgvlied

References

External links

Frans Molenaar (official website)

1940 births
2015 deaths
Dutch fashion designers
Designers from Amsterdam
Dutch LGBT artists